Elections to Sheffield City Council were held on 6 May 1976. One third of the council was up for election.

Election result

|- style="background-color:#F9F9F9"
! style="background-color: " |
| British National
| align="right" | 0
| align="right" | 0
| align="right" | 0
| align="right" | 0
| align="right" | 0.0
| align="right" | 0.1
| align="right" | 220
| align="right" | N/A
|-

This result has the following consequences for the total number of seats on the Council after the elections:

Ward results

|- style="background-color:#F9F9F9"
! style="background-color: " |
| British National
| J. Judge
| align="right" | 220
| align="right" | 6.1
| align="right" | +6.1
|-

By-elections between 1976 and 1978

|- style="background-color:#F9F9F9"
! style="background-color: " |
| British National
| Stephen Varley
| align="right" | 20
| align="right" | 1.1
| align="right" | +1.1
|-

References

1976 English local elections
1976
1970s in Sheffield
May 1976 events in the United Kingdom